Claire Berest (born 14 July 1982 in Paris) is a French writer. Her partner is lawyer and writer, Abel Quentin.

Biography
Before publishing her first novel, Berest worked as a teacher and completed a maîtrise at the Sorbonne. She found teaching in a poor socio-economic area difficult and resigned after a few months, describing the situation as being in 'permanent war'. Based on her experience, she wrote a book about her disillusionment with the French school system, La Lutte des classes.

With her sister Anne, she wrote Gabriële, a tribute to their great grand-mother Gabrièle Buffet-Picabia. Her novel about Frida Kahlo, Rien n'est noir received the Grand prix des lectrices de Elle in 2020.

Books
 Mikado, éditions Léo Scheer, 2011
 L’orchestre vide, éditions Léo Scheer, 2012 
 La lutte des classes : Pourquoi j'ai démissionné de l'Éducation nationale, éditions Léo Scheer, 2012
 Enfants perdus, éditions Plein jour, 2014
 Bellevue, Éditions Stock, 2016
 Gabriële (with Anne Berest), Éditions Stock, 2017
 Rien n’est noir, Éditions Stock, 2019 
 Artifices, Éditions Stock, 2021

References

1982 births
Living people
21st-century French novelists
21st-century French women writers